The Men's 100 metre backstroke competition at the 2019 World Championships was held on 22 and 23 July 2019. The defending champion was Xu Jiayu, and he successfully defended his title. Jiayu set a competition record in the semifinals by winning his semifinal in 52.17 seconds.

Records
Prior to the competition, the existing world and championship records were as follows.

The following new records were set during this competition.

Results

Heats
The heats were held on 22 July at 10:20.

Due to backstroke wedge malfunctions, Simone Sabbioni and Dylan Carter swam alone in new series, after the end of the normal series, and both achieved classification. The swimmers who had obtained the vacancy, and would be disqualified after these 2 series (Thomas Ceccon and Richárd Bohus), received extra vacancies for the semifinal, that ended up being with 18 swimmers.

Semifinals
The semifinals were held on 22 July at 20:18.

Semifinal 1

Semifinal 2

Final
The final was held on 23 July at 21:06.

References

Men's 100 metre backstroke